Lorne Edmund Nystrom,  (born April 26, 1946) is a Canadian politician and was a member of the House of Commons of Canada from 1968 to 1993 and again from 1997 to 2004. He is a member of the New Democratic Party. Nystrom has been a prominent figure in the New Democratic Party for most of his career.

Parliamentary career
Born in Wynyard, Saskatchewan, he was first elected for Yorkton—Melville in 1968. At the age of 22 years and three months, he was the youngest MP in Canadian history, a record he held until Claude-André Lachance was elected at the age of 20 in 1974. He was reelected without serious difficulty until losing to Reform challenger Garry Breitkreuz in 1993.

He returned to Parliament in 1997 in the riding of Qu'Appelle, succeeding fellow New Democrat Simon De Jong. Nystrom faced a strong challenge for re-election in the riding, renamed Regina—Qu'Appelle in 2000, after the Progressive Conservatives unexpectedly failed to nominate a candidate. However, Nystrom managed to eke out a narrow victory over Canadian Alliance challenger Don Leier.

In 2004, Nystrom lost to Conservative candidate, future House Speaker and Leader of the Official Opposition Andrew Scheer. Scheer won by a margin of 861 votes. The NDP renominated Nystrom to challenge Scheer at the next federal election in 2005; in the 2006 election, he lost again, this time by a larger margin of 2,740 votes.

Nystrom edited a book on practical progressive economics, Just Making Change: The 100 Percent, Honest to Goodness Truth About our User Unfriendly Financial System and How to Escape It, published in hardcover in 1999 and paperback in 2000.

Career outside of Parliament

Nystrom ran for the leadership of the federal NDP three times, placing third in each. In 1975, he finished behind winner Ed Broadbent and runner-up Rosemary Brown. Twenty years later, in 1995, Nystrom ran again but placed behind Svend Robinson and winner Alexa McDonough. His final attempt to win the party's leadership was in the 2003 election that ultimately selected Jack Layton; Nystrom finished in third behind Layton and Bill Blaikie.

In 1992, he was appointed to the Queen's Privy Council for Canada.

As of 2012, Nystrom is a board member of the Centre for Israel and Jewish Affairs (CIJA). Nystrom has also been involved with Brightenview Development International Inc. as the VP of Government Relations and CEO of Brightenvantage International Business Consulting Inc., a subsidiary of Brightenview.

Electoral record

References

External links
 Encyclopedia of Saskatchewan entry

1946 births
Living people
New Democratic Party MPs
Members of the King's Privy Council for Canada
Members of the House of Commons of Canada from Saskatchewan
Members of the United Church of Canada
Canadian people of Swedish descent
People from Wynyard, Saskatchewan
21st-century Canadian politicians